Otto James Messmer (August 16, 1892 – October 28, 1983) was an American animator known for his work on the Felix the Cat cartoons and comic strip produced by the Pat Sullivan studio.

The extent of Messmer's role in the creation and popularity of Felix is a matter of ongoing dispute, particularly as he only laid his claim to the character after the death of Sullivan, who until that time had received the credit.

Early life 
Messmer was born on August 16, 1892, to a German Catholic family in West Hoboken, New Jersey (now Union City). He attended Holy Family Parochial School. He had a love of vaudeville and the entertainment industry instilled in him by his parents and teachers beginning at a young age. He attended the Thomas School of Art in New York City from 1911–1913, and participated in a work-study program with the Acme Agency, where he did illustrations for fashion catalogs.

Career 
Messmer's first love, however, was cartooning. Inspired by Winsor McCay's animated films, such as How a Mosquito Operates, Messmer began creating his own comics for local newspapers in 1912, the same year he met Anne Mason, whom he married in 1934. One of his comics, Fun, ran as part of the Sunday comics' page for New York World.

Messmer signed a deal with Jack Cohn of Universal Studios in 1915 to produce a test film of a character Messmer created called "Motor Mat". It was never released, but drew the interest of animator Pat Sullivan, though Messmer instead decided to go to work with Henry "Hy" Mayer, a well-known cartoonist. Mayer and Messmer collaborated on the successful animated series The Travels of Teddy, which was based on the life of Teddy Roosevelt. Messmer would subsequently work for Sullivan, who handled the business side of the work, with Messmer handling creative responsibilities.  When Sullivan served a nine-month prison sentence in 1917, Messmer briefly returned to work with Mayer, until Messmer was drafted into World War I.
 
When Messmer returned to the United States in 1919, he returned to Sullivan's studio, which was hired by director Earl Hurd of Paramount Screen Magazine for a cartoon short that would accompany a feature film. Sullivan gave the project to Messmer, whose end result, Feline Follies, starred Master Tom, a black cat, who was a prototype to Felix, which brought good luck to people in trouble.

Sullivan's  involvement in the project is disputed, although handwriting in the animation has been identified as his. In addition to Sullivans handwriting in 'Feline Follies', the Australian term for mother 'MUM' is used in a speech bubble of one of the kittens at the 4:00 mark of 'Feline Follies'.

Felix was the first cartoon character created and developed for the screen, as well as the first to become a licensed, mass merchandised character. Both his design and his unique character were highly influential. Sullivan took the credit for Felix, and though Messmer directed and was the lead animator on all of the episodes he appeared in, Sullivan's name was the only onscreen credit that appeared in them. Messmer also oversaw the direction of the Felix newspaper strip, doing most of the pencils and inks on the strip until 1954.

Felix the Cat starred in over 150 cartoons until 1931, when animation studios began converting to sound films. The newspaper strip's popularity began to fade in the late 1930s, though the character was reintroduced to new fans via comic books in the 1940s. Messmer then teamed with Douglas Leigh on the large moving electronic signs that lit up Times Square.

Messmer also produced more Felix comic books in the 1940s and 1950s for companies such as Dell Comics, Toby Press, and Harvey Comics, as well as doing animation for Famous Studios (Several Popeye cartoons carry his credit). By the 1960s, Felix had been reinvented for television, and Messmer's longtime assistant Joe Oriolo (the creator of Casper the Friendly Ghost) made sure that Messmer was finally credited as the creator of Felix the Cat. Messmer continued working on the character for the rest of his life.

Death and legacy 
Messmer died from a heart attack at Holy Name Medical Center in Teaneck, New Jersey on October 28, 1983. He was 91 years old. Today, Felix the Cat is run in syndication in over 250 newspapers all over the world.

References 

Other sources
Mavromatis, Kally; "Felix the Cat – Silent Star of April 1999", accessed April 5, 2007.
Gordon, Ian. Felix the Cat at St. James Encyclopedia of Pop Culture, accessed April 5, 2007.
Canemaker, John. Felix: the Twisted Tale of the World's Most Famous Cat. New York: Pantheon, 1991.

External links 
Otto Messmer.com

 
 Lambiek Comiclopedia article

1892 births
1983 deaths
People from Union City, New Jersey
American people of German descent
Animators from New Jersey
American comics artists
American military personnel of World War I
Catholics from New Jersey
American cartoonists
Famous Studios people